Odilo Pedro Scherer (born 21 September 1949) is a Brazilian cardinal of the Catholic Church. Since 2007 he has been the  Archbishop of São Paulo, where he was auxiliary bishop from 2001 to 2007. From 1994 to 2001 he worked in Rome at the Congregation for Bishops.

He was made a cardinal in November 2007. In the international media, he was mentioned as a possible contender to succeed Benedict XVI in 2013. He has been Grand-Chancellor of the Pontifical Catholic University of São Paulo (PUC-SP) since 2003.

Biography

Early life and ordination
Scherer is German Brazilian and was born on 21 September 1949 in Cerro Largo, Rio Grande do Sul, to Edwino and Francisca (née Steffens) Scherer. He is a nephew of Alfredo Scherer (1903–96), who was Cardinal Archbishop of Porto Alegre. His father's family emigrated from Tholey, Saarland. His mother was also descended from immigrants from Saarland.

After attending the minor and major seminaries in Curitiba, Scherer studied at the Pontifical Catholic University of Paraná and the Pontifical Gregorian University (from where he obtained his Doctorate of Sacred Theology in 1991) in Rome. He was ordained to the priesthood by Archbishop Armando Círio, OSI, on 7 December 1976.

Professor and curialist
He served as director and professor at the diocesan seminary of Cascavel (1977–1978), the diocesan seminary of Toledo (1979–1982, 1993), and the Centro Interdiocesano de Teologia de Cascavel (1991–1993).

Before doing pastoral work in Toledo from 1985 to 1988, Scherer taught philosophy at the Ciências Humanas Arnaldo Busatto (1980–1985), and theology at the Instituto Teológico Paulo VI (1985). He then taught at the Universidade Estadual do Oeste do Paraná until 1994.

From 1994 to 2001, he was an official of the Congregation for Bishops in the Roman Curia, while serving as a Roman pastor and chaplain during his spare time. During those years in Europe Scherer also on various occasions studied the German language at the Goethe-Institut in Staufen im Breisgau.

Bishop and Archbishop
On 28 November 2001, Scherer was appointed Auxiliary Bishop of São Paulo and Titular Bishop of Novi. He received his episcopal consecration on 2 February 2002, from Cardinal Cláudio Hummes, OFM, with Archbishops Armando Círio and Anuar Battisti serving as co-consecrators. He was made Secretary General of the Brazilian Episcopal Conference in 2003. In this way, he also became the Grand-Chancellor of the Pontifical Catholic University of São Paulo (PUC-SP).

Cardinal
Pope Benedict XVI named Scherer as the seventh Archbishop of São Paulo on 21 March 2007. He replaced Cardinal Hummes, who was made Prefect of the Congregation for the Clergy. His appointment brought an end to almost four decades of Franciscan leadership of the archdiocese; before Hummes, Paulo Evaristo Arns led the diocese for 28 years. Scherer accompanied Pope Benedict for a great part of his visit to Brazil in May 2007, which was largely held in the former's see of São Paulo, and he delivered a speech during a ceremony to celebrate the Pope's arrival.

On 17 October 2007, the Pope announced that he would make Scherer a Cardinal. Scherer was elevated to the College of Cardinals in the consistory at St. Peter's Basilica on 24 November 2007, becoming Cardinal-Priest of Sant'Andrea al Quirinale.

On 12 June 2008, he was appointed by Benedict as a member of the Congregation for the Clergy. On 5 January 2011, he was appointed among the first members of the newly created Pontifical Council for the Promotion of the New Evangelisation.

On 30 November 2013, he was named a Member of the Congregation for Catholic Education by Pope Francis.

Coronavirus pandemic

During the COVID-19 pandemic, Cardinal Scherer as Archbishop of São Paulo defended that churches remain open, but with a greater number of liturgical celebrations per day, in an attempt to prevent large gatherings. Later, he declared the suspension of celebrations with the people.

Views

General outlook
Scherer is considered to be theologically moderate. He is one of just a handful of cardinals that use modern social media routinely.

Evangelization

According to a 23 July 2010, article by the website of the Catholic Zenit News Agency, Cardinal Scherer thinks there is an "evangelization deficit" around the globe today, which is why Pope Benedict established a new division of the Roman Curia to deal with that issue. Cardinal Scherer was quoted in the article as saying that the Pope "brings all to understand that this [new evangelization] is an objective of his, and that it must be the attitude of the Church worldwide, to respond to the challenges launched by the present 'change of age in the history of humanity.'"

Abortion
Cardinal Scherer asked Brazilians that if the country's Supreme Court legalizes abortion for fetus' with anencephaly, what will be the next group ‘incompatible with life’ to be eliminated?

Liberation theology
He once criticized liberation theology's use of "Marxism as a tool of analysis," but supported its focus on social injustice and poverty (as fully in keeping with established, orthodox Catholic doctrine on these issues).

Secularism in Brazil
Cardinal Scherer has argued that removing crucifixes in public places would not be in the best interests of Brazilian secularism.

Priests and the liturgy
In reference to the popular Brazilian priest Marcelo Rossi, Scherer stated that, "Priests aren't showmen. ...The Mass is not to be transformed into a show".

References

External links

 
 
 Twitter account of Dom Odilo Scherer 4 March 2013

|-

1949 births
Living people
Brazilian cardinals
Brazilian people of German descent
21st-century Roman Catholic archbishops in Brazil
Cardinals created by Pope Benedict XVI
People from Rio Grande do Sul
Pontifical Gregorian University alumni
Members of the Congregation for the Clergy
Members of the Order of the Holy Sepulchre
Roman Catholic bishops of São Paulo
Roman Catholic archbishops of São Paulo